is a post late-Heian period Japanese collection of short stories.

Authorship
With the exception of one story, the authorship is unknown. It is likely each story was written by different authors at various times and later collected together into a single text.

Ōsaka Koenu Gonchūnagon is known to have been composed in 1055 by Lady Koshikibu.

In addition, poems from Hanazakura Oru Shōshō, Hodohodo no Kesō, Kaiawase, and Haizumi are included in the 1271 Fūyō Wakashū indicating an upper bound for these stories.

Tradition states that Fujiwara no Tameuji (1222–1286) and Fujiwara no Tamesuke (1263–1328) created copies of the manuscripts also indicating completion of the text by the 13th century.

Contents
The meaning of the title is unknown. There are two main theories:
A reflection of the various stories (monogatari) bound (tsutsumi) together into a single collection.
An appellation to Fujiwara no Kanesuke who was known as the Riverside Middle Counselor due to his residence near the Kamo River.

The text contains ten short stories:

 There is also an incomplete fragment at the end.

Manuscripts
There are approximately 60 existing manuscripts, but the original no longer exists. Each manuscript has difficult to read passages and the text as a whole needs to be supplemented by comparison with other manuscripts.

References

External links
Kyōto University manuscript

Late Old Japanese texts
Japanese anthologies
Monogatari
12th-century Japanese books